The Conditions (Konditsii) were an 18th-century constitutional project in Russia, signed by Empress Anna of Russia in Mitau on 18 January 1730, giving substantial power to the Supreme Privy Council. When the Empress returned to Russia, she revoked her approval of the Conditions and dissolved the Supreme Privy Council on the 20 February. The members of the council were removed from government and exiled or repressed paving the way for Anna to  become an absolute monarch in the model of her uncle Peter the Great.

Background 
In the period January 18 (29) to January 20 (31), 1730 the members of the Supreme Privy Council compiled the conditions immediately after the death of Peter II and before they were sent to the capital of Courland, Mitava, to be presented to Anna of Russia, who had been elected the inheritress of the Russian throne.

A curious feature is that the document remained unpublished by the high officials (“verhovniki). The majority of the nobility had to guess about its content when the conditions have been presented at the meeting of the officials held on February 2 (13), 1730. Only then was there I  the Russian nobility an obvious split - which led, in particular, to the appearance of programs of noble opposition.

The Conditions, according to contemporaries, were only a preliminary document, as a squeeze of the more extensive radical plan developed by the Prince Golitsyn was not approved by the Secret Council. Not having come to an internal agreement, the 'verhovnik did not propose their own draft of the future state structure but suggested to the nobility to develop it by themselves when the nobility were gathered in Moscow to draw up the next Ulozhenanaya Commission and to the failed wedding ceremony of the Peter II. 

There were seven major drafts, and none of them preserved absolutism. Some proposed to limit the monarch's power by the parliament or by the state council, according to the English or Swedish model to which Golitsyn's project belonged, others to make the emperor elective as in Poland and still others proposed to establish an aristocratic republic. The most popular project, which was supported by 364 people, was sometimes called the Cherkassky-Tatishchev Projectand would establish the Higher Government of 21 people and introduce the election of members of this government, senators, governors and presidents of colleges by the second chamber of 100 people. Since the Supreme Secret Council would be abolished by the project, most verhovniki were against it.

Dmitry Golitsyn, the main author of the Conditions, did not directly report that the power of the Supreme Secret Council was temporary and so most of the high-ranking officials, as well as many young lower officers, thought that Golitsyn and the Supreme Secret Council wanted to usurp power. All of those misinterpretations were worsened by absolutist propaganda from Theophan Prokopovich.

The nobility began to oppose the Conditions. When Anna Ivanovna came in Moscow, noble delegations came to her demanding her to abolish the Conditions and return to absolutism.

 Terms 

The Conditions acted as a constitution binding the monarch in relation to declarations of war, the signing of treaties, the imposing of new taxes, the appointing of officers to ranks higher than plolkovnik'' (colonel), the depriving and granting of estates, appointments to the court ranks and the use of public revenues.

None of those powers could be exercised by the monarch under the Conditions without the approval of the Supreme Privy Council, or else the monarch would face the possibility of deposition.

1730s in the Russian Empire
1730 in Europe
Political history of Russia